The Energy and Petroleum Regulatory Authority (EPRA) formerly, the Energy Regulatory Commission(ERC) is an independent regulatory authority  responsible  for technical and economic regulation of electricity, petroleum (Upstream, midstream and downstream) and renewable energy  subsectors in Kenya.

History 

The Electric Power Act of 1997 created the Electricity Regulatory Board(ERB) whose mandate was to regulate the electricity subsector in Kenya. Subsequent reforms in the energy sector informed the creation of the Energy Regulatory Commission through the promulgation of Energy Act  No 12 of 2006 and revised in 2012. The Energy Act No 1 of 2019  repealed the Energy Act no 12  of 2006 allowing for the establishment of the Energy and Petroleum Regulatory Authority(EPRA) with and expanded mandate to regulate the entire energy sector.

Location 
The offices of the Energy and Petroleum Regulatory Authority are located at the Eagle Africa Centre, Longonot Road, Upper Hill, Nairobi city.

Authority

The Energy and Petroleum Regulatory Authority regulates the electric utilities, Petroleum industry and Coal development in Kenya through the Energy Act of 2019. It carries out  Licensing, Economic regulation, enforcement and compliance and complaints and dispute resolution.

Electric utilities
EPRA regulates several electric utilities; Kenya Electricity Generating Company,Geothermal Development Company,Kenya Electricity Transmission Company, Kenya Power and Lighting Company,Rural Electrification and Renewable Energy Corporation, mini-grid operators and Independent Power Producers.

Petroleum utilities
EPRA regulates several Petroleum utilties;Kenya Pipeline Company, the National Oil Corporation of Kenya and Oil Marketing Companies. It also regulates the upstream petroleum and the Coal development.

Members
The board of directors are appointed by the Cabinet secretary of Energy while the chairperson is appointed by the President of the Republic of Kenya for a term of three years except the chairperson of the board whose term is four years. The contract is subject to renewal for one more term. The 2022 chairperson is Jackton Boma Ojwang.
The current board members are; 
Gordon .O. Kihalangwa, Andrew N. Kamau,Albert Mwenda, Mercy Muthoni Wambugu, Barnabas Ngeno, Daniel Ndonye, James Mbugua, Moses Mutuli, George Mwakule and Masini J. Ichwara.

Auxiliary institutions and allied agencies 
 Kenya Electricity Generating Company
 Geothermal Development Company
 Kenya Electricity Transmission Company
 Kenya Power and Lighting Company
 Rural Electrification and Renewable Energy Corporation
 Nuclear Power and Energy Agency
 Kenya Pipeline Company 
 National Oil Corporation of Kenya

See also 
 Energy Regulators Association of East Africa

External links 
 Energy Regulation Centre of Excellence

References 

Energy regulatory authorities
Energy markets
Energy in Kenya
2019 establishments in Kenya
Government agencies established in 2019